Heather MacLean (born April 1, 1992) is a Canadian competitive swimmer.  At the 2012 Summer Olympics in London, she competed for the national team in the women's 4x100-metre freestyle relay, which finished in 11th place in the heats, and did not advance to the event final.

Sister Brittany MacLean was also a member of the 2012 Canadian Olympic swimming team.

References

External links
 

1992 births
Living people
Canadian female freestyle swimmers
Olympic swimmers of Canada
Swimmers from Mississauga
Swimmers at the 2012 Summer Olympics
UBC Thunderbirds swimmers